Replication termination factor 2 is a protein that in humans is encoded by the RTF2 gene.

References

External links

Further reading